Fluctuation and Noise Letters (FNL) is a journal published by World Scientific since 2001. It is at present the only journal solely dedicated to interdisciplinary articles on fluctuations and noise in physical, biological, and technological systems, and encourages open public debate.

Some topics covered to date include: noise-enhanced phenomena including stochastic resonance; cardiovascular dynamics; quantum fluctuations; statistical physics; degradation and aging phenomena; traffic; the stock market; and climate.

The founder and first Editor-in-Chief of FNL was Laszlo B. Kish (Texas A&M University, USA) who was in charge in the period of 2001-2008. Since 2009, the Editor-in-Chief is Peter V. E. McClintock (Lancaster University, UK).

Abstracting and indexing 
The journal is indexed in:
 Mathematical Reviews
 INSPEC
 Science Citation Index Expanded
 Current Contents/Physical, Chemical & Earth Sciences
 CompuMath Citation Index
 ISI Alerting Services

External links
Fluctuation and Noise Letters on Scholar Google

Publications established in 2001
World Scientific academic journals
English-language journals
Physics journals